Briche may refer to
André Briche (1772–1825), French general 
Roberto Briche, 16th century English sailor 
Souzy-la-Briche, a commune in the northern France

See also
Brish (disambiguation)